In mathematics, the Hausdorff maximal principle is an alternate and earlier formulation of Zorn's lemma proved by Felix Hausdorff in 1914 (Moore 1982:168). It states that in any partially ordered set, every totally ordered subset is contained in a maximal totally ordered subset.

The Hausdorff maximal principle is one of many statements equivalent to the axiom of choice over ZF (Zermelo–Fraenkel set theory without the axiom of choice). The principle is also called the Hausdorff maximality theorem or the Kuratowski lemma (Kelley 1955:33).

Statement

The Hausdorff maximal principle states that, in any partially ordered set, every totally ordered subset is contained in a maximal totally ordered subset (a totally ordered subset that, if enlarged in any way, does not remain totally ordered). In general, there may be many maximal totally ordered subsets containing a given totally ordered subset.

An equivalent form of the Hausdorff maximal principle is that in every partially ordered set there exists a maximal totally ordered subset. To prove that this statement follows from the original form, let A be a partially ordered set. Then  is a totally ordered subset of A, hence there exists a maximal totally ordered subset containing , hence in particular A contains a maximal totally ordered subset. For the converse direction, let A be a partially ordered set and T a totally ordered subset of A. Then

is partially ordered by set inclusion , therefore it contains a maximal totally ordered subset P. Then the set  satisfies the desired properties.

The proof that the Hausdorff maximal principle is equivalent to Zorn's lemma is very similar to this proof.

Examples 
If A is any collection of sets, the relation "is a proper subset of" is a strict partial order on A. Suppose that A is the collection of all circular regions (interiors of circles) in the plane. One maximal totally ordered sub-collection of A consists of all circular regions with centers at the origin. Another maximal totally ordered sub-collection consists of all circular regions bounded by circles tangent from the right to the y-axis at the origin.

If (x0, y0) and (x1, y1) are two points of the plane ℝ2, define (x0, y0) < (x1, y1) if y0 = y1 and x0 < x1. This is a partial ordering of ℝ2 under which two points are comparable only if they lie on the same horizontal line. The maximal totally ordered sets are horizontal lines in ℝ2.

References

 John Kelley (1955), General topology, Von Nostrand. 
 Gregory Moore (1982), Zermelo's axiom of choice, Springer.
 James Munkres (2000), Topology, Pearson.

Axiom of choice
Mathematical principles
Order theory